Michael Faber (born 12 May 1995) is a German footballer who plays as a midfielder for SpVgg Osterhofen.

In summer 2017, he transferred from Jahn Regensburg to DJK Vilzing.

References

External links
 
 

1995 births
Living people
German footballers
Association football midfielders
SSV Jahn Regensburg players
3. Liga players
SSV Jahn Regensburg II players